Hydroxyamphetamine may refer to:

 Phenylpropanolamine (β-hydroxyamphetamine)
 L-Norpseudoephedrine
 Cathine
 Gepefrine (3-hydroxyamphetamine) 
 4-Hydroxyamphetamine
 N-Hydroxyamphetamine